Gjerpen Idrettsforening is a sports club in Skien, Norway. It was founded in 1918. Among the club's activities are handball, skiing and athletics. In handball the club's women's team has won the National championships several times. Notable players are Kjerstin Andersen, Hanne Hegh and Siri Eftedal.

Handball 
The women's handball team currently compete in Eliteserien, since their promotion in 2016.

Technical staff
 Head coach: Katja Nyberg
 Goal keeper coach: Vidar Halvorsen

Notable former club and National Team players
  Kjerstin Andersen
  Hanne Hegh
  Siri Eftedal
  Jeanette Nilsen
  Cecilie Thorsteinsen
  Heidi Løke
  Anja Hammerseng-Edin
  Emilie Hegh Arntzen
  Mia Hundvin
  Camilla Thorsen
  Raja Toumi
  Melanie Bak
  Pernille Fisker

Notable former club players
  Gro Knutsen
  Janne Grimholt
  Hanne-Stine Bratli
  Iva Zamorska
  Erika Polozova
  Karin Nilsson
  Tina Bjerke
  Randi Aasarød
  Kari-Anne Solfjeld Eid
  Brigitte Myklebust
  Renate Saastad Sømme

References

Sport in Skien
Norwegian handball clubs
1918 establishments in Norway
Athletics clubs in Norway
Multi-sport clubs in Norway